Yang So-hee (born 8 April 1976) is a South Korean taekwondo practitioner. 

She won a gold medal in finweight at the 1997 World Taekwondo Championships in Hong Kong, and a silver medal at the 1995 World Taekwondo Championships. She won a gold medal in finweight at the 1996 Asian Taekwondo Championships in Melbourne.

References

External links

1976 births
Living people
South Korean female taekwondo practitioners
World Taekwondo Championships medalists
Asian Taekwondo Championships medalists
20th-century South Korean women